Dimitri Dragin (born 2 December 1984 in Le Havre, France) is a French judoka who competed at the 2008 Summer Olympics in the men's extra lightweight division.  He is regarded as having some of the best ashi waza in international judo

References

External links

 
 
 

French male judoka
Olympic judoka of France
Judoka at the 2008 Summer Olympics
Sportspeople from Le Havre
1984 births
Living people
20th-century French people
21st-century French people